The Ogaal Newspaper was an independent newspaper based in Hargeisa, the capital of the internationally unrecognised Republic of Somaliland. Founded in 2005, it provides domestic news in both Somali and English. The outlet is part of the larger Ogaal Media Center that is headquartered in the city. Ogaal Newspaper is published daily, except for Fridays.

References

External links
Ogaal News website

2005 establishments in Somaliland
African news websites
Somali-language newspapers
Newspapers published in Somaliland
Daily newspapers published in Somaliland
Newspapers established in 2005
Newspapers published in Hargeisa